The Full Tilt Online Poker Series (FTOPS) was an online poker tournament series which ran on Full Tilt Poker.   It was established in August 2006 
and was held approximately every three months.

The FTOPS consisted of multiple tournaments in a variety of different poker games, each of which was hosted by a different Full Tilt professional.  FTOPS I consisted of eight Texas Hold 'em and Omaha Hold 'em tournaments, but the series since expanded to include Stud, Razz, and mixed games, as well as knockout bounty, shootout, cashout, short-handed, and heads up tournaments.  With the FTOPS XIII in August 2009, Full Tilt added a charity event to the series to benefit Ante Up for Africa, hosted by Don Cheadle.  The main event was a $500 buy in No Limit Holdem tournament for FTOPS I to XV and $600 from FTOPS XVI onwards. The $2,100 Two-Day Event was for a long time the highest buy-in tournament in the series, but as of FTOPS XIX, the $10,300 Two-Day Heads-Up Event surpassed it.

The series featured a number of ongoing challenges that reward players for certain feats, such as winning 30 hands without showdown.  Players who made the final table are awarded an FTOPS jacket, and event winners were awarded an FTOPS gold jersey and an FTOPS gold jersey avatar to represent them at Full Tilt’s tables.  At the FTOPS XV in February 2010, any player who made the money in 17 of the 27 events would have received a $1 million bonus.

While the FTOPs series included many notable performance by top poker pros, arguably the most notable feat was accomplished in August 2008, when poker pro Yuval Bronshtein, playing under his handle "Yuvee04" took down two FTOPS in the same day. Bronshtein won four FTOPs total, which is also an all time FTOPs record.

Full Tilt also ran the MiniFTOPS, which took place one month later and featured the same events at one-tenth of the original buy-ins.

FTOPS Main Event winners

See also
World Cup of Poker
World Championship of Online Poker

Notes

External links
Official site

Full Tilt Poker
Poker tournaments